is a former Japanese football player.

Playing career
Hoshido was born in Saitama Prefecture on October 4, 1978. After graduating from high school, he joined the J1 League club Júbilo Iwata in 1997. On March 19, he debuted against Avispa Fukuoka in the 1997 J.League Cup. However, he did not play again after that match, as the club had many Japan national team players.  He left the club at the end of the 1998 season. After two years' hiatus, he joined the J2 League club Ventforet Kofu. He played many matches as a substitute forward in 2001. However he did not play at all in 2002 and retired in June 2002.

Club statistics

References

External links

1978 births
Living people
Association football people from Saitama Prefecture
Japanese footballers
J1 League players
J2 League players
Júbilo Iwata players
Ventforet Kofu players
Association football forwards